This is a list of the songs that reached number-one position in official Polish single chart in ZPAV in 2017.

Chart history

Number-one artists

See also 
 Polish Music Charts
 List of number-one albums of 2017 (Poland)

References 

Poland
2017
No On